Mees Kaandorp (born 8 June 1998) is a Dutch professional footballer who plays as a winger for Eerste Divisie club De Graafschap.

Club career
He made his Eerste Divisie debut for Jong AZ on 6 October 2017 in a game against Jong PSV, as a 72nd-minute substitute for Matthijs Hardijk.

On 20 July 2021, Kaandorp signed a two-year contract with an option for an additional year with De Graafschap.

References

External links
 

1998 births
People from Heiloo
Footballers from North Holland
Living people
Dutch footballers
Association football forwards
Jong AZ players
Almere City FC players
De Graafschap players
Eerste Divisie players